Loveys is a surname. Notable people with the surname include:

Ralph A. Loveys (1929–2017), American politician
Walter Loveys (1920–1969), British farmer and politician

See also
 Lovey (disambiguation)